The Company is a 2003 American drama film directed by Robert Altman with a screenplay by Barbara Turner from a story by Turner and star and co-producer Neve Campbell. The film also stars Malcolm McDowell and James Franco, and is set in the company of the Joffrey Ballet.

Plot

The Company is composed of stories gathered from the dancers, choreographers, and staff of the Joffrey Ballet. Most of the roles are played by company members. While a small subplot relates a love story between Campbell's character and a character, a chef played by James Franco, most of the movie focuses on the company as a whole, without any real star or linear plot. The many company stories woven together express the dedication and hard work that dancers must put into their art, although they are seldom rewarded with fame or fortune.

Cast
 Neve Campbell as Loretta 'Ry' Ryan
 Malcolm McDowell as Alberto Antonelli
 James Franco as Josh Williams

The part of Alberto Antonelli was reportedly inspired by the real life dancer and choreographer Gerald Arpino.

Production

Development
The Company was an idea of Campbell's for a long time—she began her career as a ballet dancer, having been a student at Canada's National Ballet School. Altman was initially reluctant to direct the film, reportedly remarking, "Barbara, I read your script and I don't get it. I don't understand. I don't know what it is. I'm just the wrong guy for this." The director eventually relented, and The Company turned out to be his penultimate film. Neve Campbell and James Franco prepared for their roles as restaurant workers by training under Mickaël Blais, the chef of Marche, an upscale bistro in Chicago.

Dance lighting
Dance lighting for the Joffrey Ballet portions was composed by the dance lighting designer Kevin Dreyer.

Pieces in the film
Excerpts of the following dance pieces are included in the film:

 Alwin Nikolais's "Tensile Involvement" (opening piece, with ensemble bound by elastic)
 Gerald Arpino's "Light Rain", "Suite Saint-Saëns", and "Trinity"
 Moses Pendleton's "White Widow" (dance with the swing)
 Robert Desrosiers's "The Blue Snake"
 Arthur Saint-Leon's "La Vivandière" (excerpt from Pas de Six)
 Lar Lubovitch's "My Funny Valentine" (pas de deux; the performance in the thunderstorm)
 Laura Dean's "Creative Force" (Campbell's flashback; the excerpt for 10 dancers in red costumes)

Reception

Box office
The Company was given a limited release on December 25, 2003, earning $93,776 in eleven theaters over its opening weekend. The film ultimately grossed $2,283,914 in North America and $4,117,776 in foreign markets, bringing its worldwide box office total to $6,401,690—well below its estimated $15 million budget.

Critical response
On Rotten Tomatoes the film has a 71% rating based on reviews from 134 critics. The site's consensus states: "Its deliberately unfocused narrative may frustrate some viewers, but The Company finds Altman gracefully applying his distinctive eye to the world of dance." On Metacritic it has a score of 73% based on reviews from 32 critics, indicating "generally favorable reviews".

Roger Ebert of the Chicago Sun-Times praised the film, awarding it  stars out of four. Ed Gonzalez of Slant Magazine similarly declared it the best movie of 2003. Elvis Mitchell of The New York Times called the film "enjoyably lithe and droll" and attributed a "great deal of the film's appeal" to McDowell's performance, while opining that the film "doesn't stick with you as a whole."

References

External links
 
 

2003 films
2003 drama films
American dance films
American drama films
Films about ballet
Films set in Chicago
Films shot in Chicago
Films scored by Van Dyke Parks
Films directed by Robert Altman
Films produced by Christine Vachon
Joffrey Ballet
Killer Films films
Sony Pictures Classics films
2000s English-language films
2000s American films